Gerald James Maier,  (born September 22, 1928) is a Canadian petroleum executive. He is the former Chairman, President and CEO of TransCanada PipeLines Ltd.

Maier was born and raised in Wilcox, Saskatchewan. He attended the Athol Murray College of Notre Dame and then the University of Alberta. He has been chairman of the board of regents of his high school since 1997.

In 2003, he was made an Officer of the Order of Canada as "a recognized leader in the exploration, acquisition and sustainable development of our natural gas and crude oil reserves". Maier was also awarded the Canadian Engineering Leader Award, presented by the University of Calgary's Schulich School of Engineering. Maier was a member of the board of directors for the Calgary bid committee for the 1988 Winter Olympics.

References
 

1928 births
Living people
Businesspeople from Saskatchewan
Officers of the Order of Canada
People from Regina, Saskatchewan